Fair Haven Municipal Airport  was a town-owned public-use airport located two nautical miles (3.7 km) north of the central business district of Fair Haven, a town in Rutland County, Vermont, United States. The airport is closed.

Facilities and aircraft 
It had one runway designated 2/20 with a gravel and dirt surface measuring 2,000 by 20 feet (610 x 6 m). For the 12-month period ending June 7, 2005, the airport had 150 general aviation aircraft operations, an average of 12 per month.

References

External links 
 Aerial image as of 3 May 1994 from USGS The National Map

Defunct airports in the United States
Airports in Vermont
Transportation buildings and structures in Rutland County, Vermont